The Cosmic Horseshoe is the nickname given to a gravitationally lensed system of two galaxies in the constellation Leo.

The foreground galaxy lies  directly in front in the line of sight to a more distant galaxy. Due to the passage of the light from the background galaxy through the gravity field of the foreground galaxy, the background galaxy's light is lensed by the warped spacetime environment of the foreground galaxy, thus giving the background galaxy a warped appearance. Unlike most lensed galaxies, the shape of the lensed light of this background galaxy appears shaped like a horseshoe.

The foreground galaxy, LRG 3-757, is found to be extremely massive, with a mass a hundred times that of this galaxy. It is notable because it belongs to a rare class of galaxies called luminous red galaxies, which has an extremely luminous infrared emission.

The system was discovered in 2007 by an international team of scientists using the comprehensive Sloan Digital Sky Survey and is greatly studied by the Hubble Space Telescope.

References

Leo (constellation)
Gravitational lensing
20070615